Henry Bingham Neilson (1861 – 13 October 1941), who signed his work and was usually credited as Harry B. Neilson, less often as H. B. Neilson, was a British illustrator, mostly of children’s books.

His first career was as an engineer and electrician, working for a Liverpool shipbuilder, at sea, and in India, where he was a part-time Indian Army cavalryman, but by the 1890s his career as an illustrator was established and he lived his last 37 years in an English village.

Life and work

Born at Birkenhead, in an area called the Wirral, which was then in Cheshire, Neilson was the son of Andrew and Isabel Anne Neilson and had seven older brothers and sisters. His father was a Scottish merchant who for some years had lived and worked in Brazil, while his mother was a British subject born in Cartagena, Colombia. The family moved to England in the 1850s and was settled in Birkenhead by the time of young Harry's birth in 1861, at 39, Westbourne Road, Birkenhead, a house then set among open fields which stretched into Claughton.

In 1863 the growing Neilson family moved to a new house called Airliewood which Andrew Neilson had had built on an acre of land in Forest Road, Claughton. Neilson later recalled "My father still wore half-Wellington top boots and the old fashioned stocks. The ladies wore poke bonnets, crinolines, Paisley shawls, and many-flounced, voluminous skirts, while young men of fashion affected peg-top trousers, little pork-pie hats with fluttering ribbons, and Dundreary whiskers. Policemen still wore top hats. Croquet was practically the only outdoor game played by ladies."

In 1879 Neilson was apprenticed as an engineer with Laird Brothers, a major shipbuilding firm in Liverpool. After completing this training in 1884, he worked as an electrician on the new Red Star Line transatlantic steamer SS Noordland until 1886. In August of that year, his unmarried sister Isabel Anne died, aged 36, and in administering her estate their father was named as "Andrew Neilson, Gentleman".

Neilson had a cousin in Bihar in British India who was in charge of an indigo plantation there, and in 1887 he went out to join him. While there, he enlisted in the Bihar Light Horse as a part-time trooper. In 1889, his first illustrated book, The Adventures of Sam Pippins, Esq., with the Kilkenny Hunt, was published by Simpkin, Marshall, & Co. Meanwhile, at home in Birkenhead, in 1890 his father died, aged 73, followed in 1893 by his mother, aged 66. His father left property valued at £3,896, with his mother and brother John Robertson Neilson, a cotton broker, appointed as Executors.

During the 1890s, Neilson became active as a book illustrator, and by 1903 had returned to England to live with a sister at a house called Meadowbank, at 36 School Lane, Bidston, a village in his native Wirral. He stayed at Meadowbank for the rest of his life.

Neilson illustrated many children's books, several of them for the children's writer S. H. Hamer, who conveniently was also an editor with Cassell & Co. Neilson also worked as an illustrator of magazines and designed postcards and Christmas cards. In much of his work he depicted animals dressed as people, like his contemporaries Beatrix Potter and Harry Rountree, but often showing them in more vigorous activities. In France he has been compared with Benjamin Rabier. His best-known work, "Mr Fox's Hunt Breakfast on Xmas Day" (pictured) is said to represent five members of the Blankney Hunt, in Lincolnshire and has been widely reproduced. Dressed for hunting, the breakfast party is eating pheasant and drinking Renard (French for "fox") champagne. Pictures on the wall behind are of hunting scenes, but with foxes in pursuit of men, one of whom is going to ground. The original, a large chromolithograph, was a free gift to readers with the Christmas issue of the Penny Illustrated Paper in December 1897. One hundred years later, in December 1997, it was used as the cover art for the  Christmas-week issue of the British magazine Country Life.

Games and Gambols (1902) includes Neilson's notable picture of "The great test match between the Lions and the Kangaroos".

In 1903 and 1904, Neilson worked with the Irish dramatist William Boyle, illustrating two books of comic verse, Comic Capers and Christmas at the Zoo.

Neilson returned to the theme of "Mr Fox's Hunt Breakfast" in The Fox's Frolic; or, A Day with the Topsy Turvy Hunt (1917), illustrating a long narrative poem by Sir Francis Burnand in which the usual fox hunting roles are reversed, with the foxes riding hounds and becoming the hunters, with "the brush" pursued being a farmer's broom. An American edition appeared in 1935.

Neilson was a keen rider, keeping his own horse, which he groomed himself. In 1935 he published Auld-lang-syne, a book of memoirs and reminiscences of Claughton, Birkenhead, and Bidston, arranging to have it printed by a local firm, Willmer Brothers. One of the brothers, Wrayford Willmer, later remembered the arrival of a "persistent, eccentric little man" with his manuscript.

Neilson died in a nursing home at West Kirby, Cheshire, on 13 October 1941, with his home address given as Meadowbank, School Lane, Bidston, leaving an estate valued at £1070.

An archive of 325 items, including drawings, watercolours, and manuscripts by Neilson is held in the Manuscripts Division of the Charles E. Young Research Library, at the University of California, Los Angeles.

A new edition of The Fox's Frolic was published by Applewood Books in 2009.

Assessment
In his book on Arthur Rackham, Fred Gettings says

Publications

H. B. Neilson, The Adventures of Sam Pippins, Esq., with the Kilkenny Hunt, Illustrated and written by Harry B. Neilson (Simpkin, Marshall & Co., London, and John Heywood, Manchester, undated, 1889)
S. H. Hamer, Micky Magee's Menagerie, or, Strange animals and their doings, illustrated by Harry B. Neilson (Cassell & Company, London, Paris, New York & Melbourne, 1897), 
Evelyn Sharp, George Manville Fenn, et al., Little Folks 1899, illustrated by Harry B. Neilson and Lewis Baumer (London: Cassell & Co., 1899)
S. H. Hamer, Whys and Other Whys, or, Curious Creatures and Their Tales, illustrated by Harry B. Neilson (London: Cassell, 1898), 
Harry B. Neilson & the Cockiolly Bird, Droll Doings, Illustrations by Harry B. Neilson, with Verses by the Cockiolly Bird  (London: Blackie & Son, 1900), 
Harry B. Neilson, An Animal A B C (London: Blackie & Son, 1900), 
S. H. Hamer, Harry B. Neilson, Topsy-Turvy Tales, or The Exception Proves the Rule (London: Cassell, 1901), 
Francis T. Buckland, Curiosities of Natural History, Illustrated by H. B. Neilson (London: Methuen, new edition, 1904)
S. H. Hamer, The Jungle School; or Dr. Jibber-Jabber Burchall's Academy, With Illustrations by H. B. Neilson (London: Cassell, 1900), 
S. H. Hamer, Peter Piper's Peepshow, with Illustrations by H. B. Neilson and Lewis Baumer (London: Cassell & Company, 1900), 
S. H. Hamer, The Ten Travellers, and other tales in prose and verse, illustrated by H. B. Neilson (Cassell & Company, London, Paris, New York & Melbourne, 1902), 
H. B. Neilson & John Brymer, Games and Gambols Illustrated by Harry B. Neilson; with Verses by John Brymer (Blackie and Son, 1902), 
Sabine Baring-Gould, Amazing Adventures Drawn by H. B. Neilson and Written by S. Baring Gould (London: Skeffington & Son, 1903), 
Anon, Bo-Peep: a Treasury for the Little Ones (London, Paris, New York, Melbourne: Cassell and Company, 1903), illustrated by Harry B. Neilson and others  
William Boyle, Comic Capers, Pictures by H. B. Neilson, Verses by William Boyle (1903), 
William Boyle, Christmas at the Zoo: Described in Verse by William Boyle, with Coloured Illustrations by H. B. Neilson (1904)
Old Mother Hubbard drawn by Harry B. Neilson (Port Sunlight: printed and published by Lever Brothers, Soapmakers to H. M. the King; undated)
Clifton Bingham, The Animals' Academy, illustrated by Harry B. Neilson (London: Blackie & Son, 1904), 
S. H. Hamer, Topsy Turvy Tales, with 4 Coloured Plates and numerous Illustrations by Harry B. Neilson (1906)
Harry B. Neilson, E. A. Cubitt, Jane M. Dealy et al., Arm Chair Stories (London: Blackie and Son, undated)
Jack the Giant Killer and other stories, illustrated by Harry B. Neilson and others (London: John F. Shaw, undated)
Louis Wain, Harry B. Neilson, et al., Merry Times in Animal Land (London: James Clarke and Co., undated, c. 1907)
Harry B. Neilson, The Story of the Gray Goose drawn by Harry B. Neilson (London: Nelson, 1907)
Harry B. Neilson, The Farmyard: Over Sixty Lifelike Animals (1912) 
Anon., Little Leo's Birthday: Pictures and Verses For Little Folk (London, Glasgow and Bombay: Blackie and Son Limited, c. 1913), illustrated by Harry B. Neilson and others
Cole’s Jingle Jungle Book: Pictures and Verses for Little Folk illustrated by Harry B. Neilson (Melbourne, Sydney, Adelaide, Commonwealth of Australia: E. W. Cole, 1915) 
F. C. Burnand, The Fox's Frolic; or, A Day with the Topsy Turvy Hunt, illustrated by Harry B. Neilson (London & Glasgow: Wm. Collins, Sons & Co., 1917)
The Fox's Frolic (New York: William Collins, 1935)
The Fox's Frolic (New edition, Applewood Books, 2009)
Harry B. Neilson, Jolly Jaunts (Collins, London & Glasgow, undated), 
Birdie's Picture Book, with stories and illustrations by Harry B Neilson, H. G. C. Lambert, and others (London: S. W. Partridge & Co., undated, c. 1919) 
Partridges Children's Annual - Fourth Year of Issue with Illustrations by Louis Wain, Cecil Aldin, H G C Marsh Lambert, Harry B. Nielson, Frank Hart, M. Bowley etc. (London: S. W. Partridge & Co Ltd, c. 1920)
Harry B. Neilson, A Little Pickle (undated, c. 1920)
Harry B. Neilson, Mr. Jumbo at Home (Blackie, October 1921)
Harry B. Neilson, More Jumbo Stories (Blackie & Son, undated) 
Harry B. Neilson, Jumbo’s Jolly Tales (Blackie & Son, undated) 
Baron Krakemsides, The Careless chicken, Illus. by Harry B. Neilson (London: Frederick Warne, 1924)
Edith E. Millard, Mr Skiddleywinks, Illustrated by Harry B. Neilson (London: W. & R. Chambers, undated, but advertised in The Publisher 1927)
Edith E. Millard, Mr Skiddleywinks, Illustrated by Harry B. Neilson (New York: Frederick A. Stokes Co., 1930)
Harry B. Neilson, Auld-lang-syne: recollections and rural records of old Claughton, Birkenhead and Bidston with other reminiscences (Willmer Brothers, 1935)
S. H. Hamer, Escuela de Animales, illustrado por Harry B. Neilson'' (Barcelona: Ramon Sopena, 1942),

Notes

External links

Harry B. Neilson on Artnet
Finding Aid for the Harry B. Neilson Papers at the Charles E. Young Research Library

1861 births
1941 deaths
19th-century English artists
20th-century English artists
British children's book illustrators
Postcard artists
Magazine illustrators
Fox hunting writers
Foxes in popular culture
Military personnel of British India
People from Birkenhead